Arne Gustav Julius Nyberg (20 June 1913 – 12 August 1970) was a Swedish football striker born in Säffle.

Career 
After starting his career playing for SK Sifhälla, he joined IFK Göteborg in 1932 and won two Swedish Championships with the club. He played for IFK for the rest of his career making him a one-club man and also worked for the club after retiring as an active player.

Personal life 
Nyberg died in 1970, aged 57. His son, Ralf Nyberg, also played for IFK Göteborg and won a Swedish Championship medal.

Honours
IFK Göteborg

 Allsvenskan: 1934–35, 1941–42

References

1913 births
1970 deaths
Swedish footballers
Sweden international footballers
IFK Göteborg players
1938 FIFA World Cup players
Allsvenskan players
Association football forwards